Len Hunt Chandler, Jr. (born May 27, 1935), better known as Len Chandler, is a folk musician from Akron, Ohio.

Biography

He showed an early interest in music and began playing piano at age 8.  Studying classical music in his early teens, he learned to play the oboe so he could join the high school band, and during his senior year joined the Akron Symphony Orchestra.  He eventually earned his B.A. in Music Education from the University of Akron, moved to New York City, and received an M.A. from Columbia University.

By the early 1960s, Chandler began to get involved in the Civil Rights Movement.  He sang at demonstrations and rallies and won a reputation as a protest songwriter. One of his most famous songs was "Beans in My Ears", which was covered by the Serendipity Singers, as well as Pete Seeger. He also served as one of the original crew members of Seeger's CLEARWATER organization, working to save the environment around the Hudson River Valley. One of Chandler's song entitled "Run Come See the Sun", was sung by Pete Seeger at the Sanders Theater in Boston in the year 1980. This song had a repeated phrase, which built up the harmony as well. (Source: Pete Seeger concert at the Sanders Theater, released on Smithsonian Folkways Records.)

Chandler was also a performer in the traveling anti-war troupe F.T.A., which was organized by Jane Fonda in 1971. With Holly Near and Rita Martinson, the group toured the United States and bases throughout the Pacific Rim. The travels were filmed, however the documentary was pulled from theatres a week after its release due to the controversy surrounding Fonda's visit to Hanoi.

After penning topical material related to the Original Black Panther Party, Lew Irwin brought him to KRLA 1110 to write three topical songs a day for their radio program, The Credibility Gap,  which released some of his songs, including "Soul in Ice", on their record An Album Of Political Pornography.  At KRLA he also wrote and recorded the short theme song "The Chronicles of Pop" for the Pop Chronicles radio program.  In the early 1970s, he formed the Alternative Chorus-Songwriters Showcase to promote new talent. He moved to Los Angeles in the mid-1970s.

Len Chandlers' song "Keep On Keepin' On" of 1964 was used by Martin Luther King Jr. in a speech after King's secretary saw the song in New York Broadside issue 34.

Discography
1967 - To Be a Man (Columbia CS 9259)
1967 - The Lovin' People (Columbia CS 9553 - stereo, CL 2753 - mono)
1968 - An Album Of Political Pornography, with Lew Irwin and The Credibility Gap (Blue Thumb)

References

External links
 Illustrated Len Chandler discography
 
Pop Chronicles Interviews #153 - Len Chandler, November 7, 1968.

1935 births
American folk musicians
Musicians from Akron, Ohio
University of Akron alumni
Living people